Bryan Murphy (born 1992) is an Irish hurler who plays as a left wing-back for the Kerry senior team.

Born in Causeway, County Kerry, Murphy first played competitive hurling during his schooling at Causeway Comprehensive School. He arrived on the inter-county scene at the age of seventeen when he first linked up with the Kerry minor team before later joining the under-21 side. He made his senior debut during the 2011 league for Kerry seniors. Murphy quickly became a regular member of the starting fifteen and has won one Christy Ring Cup medal.

At club level Murphy plays with Causeway.

Honours

Team

Kerry
Christy Ring Cup (2): 2011 (sub), 2015
National League (Division 2A) (1): 2015
All-Ireland Under 21 B Hurling Championship (2): 2011, 2013
All-Ireland Minor B Hurling Championship (1): 2009

Causeway
Kerry Senior Hurling Championship (Winner) (1) 2019
Kerry Under-21 Hurling Championship (Winner) (1) 2014

References

1993 births
Living people
Causeway hurlers
Kerry inter-county hurlers